Jennifer Mbuta (born 18 October 1968) is a Kenyan archer. She competed in the women's individual event at the 1996 Summer Olympics.

References

External links
 

1968 births
Living people
Kenyan female archers
Olympic archers of Kenya
Archers at the 1996 Summer Olympics
Place of birth missing (living people)